Pantayo is the debut album by Toronto-based kulintang quintet Pantayo, released on May 8, 2020, on Toronto label Telephone Explosion. It was produced by alaska B of Yamantaka // Sonic Titan. The album was one of ten nominated for the 2020 Polaris Music Prize.

Style 
Pantayo combines the kulintang music of the South Philippines with "western" genres such as synth-pop, hip-hop, R&B, trip hop, and punk. 

There is large diversity between the musical styles showcased on Pantayo. "Heto Na" (Tagalog for "here we go") was inspired by the Original Pilipino Music scene of the 1970s. "V V V (They Lie)" has a composition that the band compared to bubble tea. "Taranta" (whose name, according to Kat Estacio, “means to panic or to feel frantic, as a mindless response") features a rap-like vocal track, while "Bahala Na" (Tagalog for "it's up to you") more relaxed, being compared to lovers rock.

Critical reception 

Pantayo was ranked the 10th best album on Exclaim!'s 50 Best Albums of 2020 list. AllMusic listed it as one of their "Favorite Latin & Global Albums" of the year. Bandcamp named it their Album of the Day on May 18, 2020.

Track listing

Personnel

Musicians 

 alaska B – drums
 Eirene Cloma – vocals, bass, keyboard
 Michelle Cruz – vocals, agong
 Joanna Delos Reyes – vocals, gandingan, sarunay
 Kat Estacio – vocals, kulintang, dabakan, programming
 Katrina Estacio – vocals, kulintang, sarunay

Production and engineering 

 alaska B – additional programming, production, mixing engineer
 Jeff "Fedge" Elliot – mastering engineer
 Kohen Hammond – additional bass engineer
 Brendan Swanson – mix engineer

Artwork 

 Pauline Despi – art direction
 Joyce Tai – logo design

References

2020 debut albums
Albums by Canadian artists
Kulintang